"Vivrant Thing" is the first single released by Q-Tip on his debut solo album Amplified. The song is also featured in A Tribe Called Quest's 1999 compilation The Anthology. It was produced by Q-Tip himself, although Jay Dee was also in the credits (they were a production duo). "Vivrant Thing" became the fourth rap song to reach number one on the Billboard Hot R&B Airplay chart since its 1992 inception. The single also reached number seven on the main Hot R&B Singles & Tracks chart, with its performance being driven overwhelmingly by airplay due to its lack of domestic availability in any configuration besides 12-inch vinyl.

The single was a success, charting the Billboard Hot 100 at number 26, making it Q-Tip's highest charting solo single to date. The beat contains a sample of "I Wanna Stay" by the Love Unlimited Orchestra. The remix features stanzas by rappers Missy Elliott and Busta Rhymes.

The song was used as the opening scene on the television series, The Game, in the episode, "The List Episode", on March 30, 2008. The beat was frequently used in the animated series MTV Downtown. It was heard once in the PEN15 episode, "Miranda".

Critical reception
Kris Ex of Rolling Stone called the song an "undeniable groove vehicle". Steve Jones of USA Today also described the tune as "bouncy and insistent".

Music video
The music video was directed by Hype Williams.

Charts

Weekly charts

Year-end charts

References

1999 debut singles
Q-Tip (musician) songs
Song recordings produced by Q-Tip (musician)
Music videos directed by Hype Williams
1999 songs
Arista Records singles
Songs written by Q-Tip (musician)
Songs written by Barry White
Songs written by J Dilla